Fevzi Davletov (born 20 September 1972) is a retired Uzbekistan International football defender.

Career statistics

International 

Scores and results list Uzbekistan's goal tally first, score column indicates score after each Davletov goal.

References

External links
Bio at playerhistory.com

Profile at KLISF

1972 births
Living people
Sportspeople from Tashkent
Soviet footballers
Uzbekistani footballers
Uzbekistani expatriate footballers
Uzbekistan international footballers
1996 AFC Asian Cup players
2000 AFC Asian Cup players
FC Rubin Kazan players
FC Tobol players
navbahor Namangan players
FC Qizilqum Zarafshon players
FK Andijon players
Expatriate footballers in Kazakhstan
Uzbekistani expatriate sportspeople in Kazakhstan
Expatriate footballers in Russia
Uzbekistani expatriate sportspeople in Russia
FC Irtysh Pavlodar players
FC Zhetysu players
FC Dustlik players
Association football defenders
Asian Games gold medalists for Uzbekistan
Asian Games medalists in football
Footballers at the 1994 Asian Games
Medalists at the 1994 Asian Games
FC Megasport players